Block capacitor may refer to:

 DC-blocking capacitor also known as coupling capacitor
 a misnomer for a decoupling, reservoir or smoothing capacitor, possibly due to the German term